Bihar and Orissa was a province of British India, which included the present-day Indian states of Bihar, Jharkhand, and Odisha. The territories were conquered by the British in the 18th and 19th centuries, and were governed by the then Indian Civil Service of the Bengal Presidency, the largest administrative subdivision in British India.

On 22 March 1912, both Bihar and Orissa divisions were separated from the Bengal Presidency as Bihar and Orissa Province. On 1 April 1936, the province was partitioned into Bihar and the Orissa Province.

History

In 1756, Bihar and Orissa were part of the Mughal Empire, with Bihar being part of the Bengal Subah and Orissa being its own Subah.

The Treaty of Allahabad was signed on 16 August 1765, between the Mughal Emperor Shah Alam II, son of the late Emperor Alamgir II, and Robert, Lord Clive, of the East India Company, as a result of the Battle of Buxar of 22 October 1764. The Treaty marks the political and constitutional involvement and the beginning of British rule in India. Based on the terms of the agreement, Alam granted the East India Company Diwani rights, or the right to collect taxes on behalf of the Emperor from the eastern province of Bengal-Bihar-Orissa.
Bihar and Orissa was separated from Bengal on 22 March 1912, with Patna as capital. A number of princely states, including the Orissa Tributary States, were under the authority of the provincial governor.

Dyarchy (1921–1937)
The Montagu–Chelmsford Reforms enacted through the Government of India Act 1919 expanded the Bihar & Orissa Legislative Council from 43 to 103 members. The Legislative Council now consisted of 2 ex-officio Executive Councillors, 25 nominated members (12 official, 13 non-official) and 76 elected members (48 Non-Muslim, 18 Muslim, 1 European, 3 Commerce & Industry, 5 Landholders and 1 University constituencies). The reforms also introduced the principle of dyarchy, whereby certain responsibilities such as agriculture, health, education, and local government, were transferred to elected ministers.

Division
On 1 April 1936, the province was divided into Bihar Province (which included present-day Bihar and Jharkhand states) and Orissa Province, and the Odia speaking princely states placed under the authority of the Eastern States Agency.

Governors of Bihar and Orissa

From 1912 to 1920, the province had a lieutenant governor heading the provincial government. This post was upgraded to governor in 1920, when Satyendra Prasanna Sinha, 1st Baron Sinha was appointed to fill it.

Lieutenant governors 
 1 April 1912 – 19 November 1915 Sir Charles Stuart Bayley (b. 1854 – d. 1935)
19 Nov 1915 –  5 April 1918 Sir Edward Albert Gait (1st term) (b. 1863 – d. 1950)
 5 April 1918 – 12 July 1918 Sir Edward Vere Levinge (acting) (b. 1867 – d. 1954)
12 Jul 1918 – 29 December 1920 Sir Edward Albert Gait (2nd term) (s.a.)

Governors 
29 Dec 1920 – 29 November 1921 Satyendra Prasanna Sinha, 1st Baron Sinha (b. 1864 – d. 1928)
29 Nov 1921 – 12 April 1922 Havilland Le Mesurier (acting) (b. 1866 – d. 1931)
12 Apr 1922 –  7 April 1927 Sir Henry Wheeler (b. 1870 – d. 1950)
 7 April 1927 –  7 April 1932 Sir Hugh Lansdowne Stephenson (b. 1871 – d. 1950)
 7 April 1932 –  1 April 1936 Sir James David Sifton (b. 1878 – d. 1952)

See also
Eastern States Agency

References

External links

History of Bihar
Provinces of British India
History of Odisha
History of Jharkhand
Bengal Presidency
1912 establishments in India
1936 disestablishments in India